Voyageur Channel Water Aerodrome  is located  east southeast of Killarney, Ontario, Canada.

References

Registered aerodromes in Ontario
Seaplane bases in Ontario
Transport in Sudbury District